The 1996–97 Argentine Primera B Nacional was the 11th season of second division professional of football in Argentina. A total of 32 teams competed; the champion and runner-up were promoted to Argentine Primera División.

Club information

Interior Zone

Metropolitana Zone

Interior Zone standings

Sub-Zone A1

Sub-Zone A2

Metropolitana Zone standings

Sub-Zone B1

Sub-Zone B2

Fourth Place Playoff
A tiebreaker was played between the teams that finished 4th in their respective zones.
For the Interior Zone played Olimpo vs Instituto and for the Metropolitana Zone played Central Córdoba (R) vs Nueva Chicago. Both matches were played in neutral stadiums. The winning teams qualified for the Championship Group.

Championship Group
The championship Group was played by the 14 teams that qualified from their zones and the 2 teams that qualified by winning the Fourth Place Playoff. The winning team was declared champion and was automatically promoted to Primera Division, and the teams placed 2nd to 5th played the Second Promotion Playoff.

Relegation Group
It was divided in 2 groups (Interior and Metropolitana). 9 teams played in each group. Teams placed 1st and 2nd qualified for the Second Promotion Playoff.

Interior Group

Metropolitano Group

Second Promotion Playoff
The Second Promotion playoff was played by the teams placed 2nd to 5th from the Championship Group and 4 teams (2 from Interior Group and 2 from Metropolitano Group) from the Relegation Group. The winning team was promoted to Primera Division.

Bracket

Note: The team in the first line plays at home the second leg.

Relegation
Note: Clubs with indirect affiliation with AFA are relegated to the Torneo Argentino A, while clubs directly affiliated face relegation to Primera B Metropolitana. Clubs with direct affiliation are all from Greater Buenos Aires, with the exception of Newell's, Rosario Central, Central Córdoba and Argentino de Rosario, all from Rosario, and Unión and Colón from Santa Fe.

Interior Zone

Metropolitana Zone

See also
1996–97 in Argentine football

References

External links

Primera B Nacional seasons
Prim
1996 in South American football leagues
1997 in South American football leagues